Kriton Curi (1942–1996) was born in Istanbul in 1942, and was a Professor and faculty member of the civil engineering department at Boğaziçi University; which is a public university in Istanbul founded in 1972 and consistently ranked highest in Turkey.

His service in developing environmental consciousness in Turkey has been recognized.

The following are named after Curi:
 Kriton Curi Parki: a park in the Eastern side of Istanbul in the province of Kozyatağı
 Kriton Curi Hall: a lecture hall at Boğaziçi University

1942 births
1996 deaths
Turkish civil engineers